Actinium (III) nitrate is an inorganic compound, actinium salt of nitric acid with the chemical formula Ac(NO3)3. The compound looks like white substance, readily soluble in water.

Synthesis
Actinium nitrate can be obtained by dissolving actinium or actinium hydroxide in nitric acid.

Properties
Actinium(III) nitrate decomposes on heating above 600 °C:

This salt is used as a source of Ac3+ ions to obtain insoluble actinium compounds by precipitation from aqueous solutions.

References

Actinium compounds
Nitrates